John H. Starkins (1841 - 4 April 1897) was a first sergeant of the United States Army who was awarded the Presidential Medal of Honor for gallantry during the American Civil War. Starkins was awarded the medal on 30 July 1896 for actions performed at the Battle of Campbell's Station in Tennessee on 16 November 1863.

Personal life 
Starkins was born in Great Neck, New York in 1841. He died in Flushing, New York on 4 April 1897 and was buried in Zion Episcopal Church Cemetery in Douglaston, New York.

Military service 
Starkins enlisted in the Army as a blacksmith on 7 October 1861 in Flushing and was assigned to the 34th New York Light Artillery. He was promoted to corporal and then to sergeant but was demoted to private during his first enlistment. He re-enlisted in the Army on 5 November 1863, as a sergeant but was demoted to private again. He was promoted to first sergeant twice, once on 13 November 1864 and once on 1 January 1865. He was mustered out of service on 21 June 1865 at Hart's Island, New York.

On 16 November 1863, during the Battle of Campbell's Station in Tennessee, Starkins maneuvered his artillery piece off the field of battle without taking any casualties. His Medal of Honor citation for this action reads:

References 

1841 births
1897 deaths
American Civil War recipients of the Medal of Honor
People from Great Neck, New York
Union Army non-commissioned officers